Rasponi is a surname. Notable people with the surname include:

Eugenia Rasponi (1873–1958), Italian noblewoman, suffragist, and businesswoman
Gabriella Rasponi Spalletti, Italian feminist, educator, and philanthropist
Giovanni Rasponi (1646–1714), Italian Roman Catholic prelate 
Lanfranco Rasponi (1914–1983), Italian author, critic, and publicist